Affect Co., Ltd. (株式会社 アフェクト) was a video game development company that was active in that industry from 1990 to 2008, primarily releasing games in Japan through other publishers. One of the first products developed by the company was a highly successful baseball simulator, Nolan Ryan's Baseball. After 2008, Affect transitioned to producing web applications.

List of games and software
XDR: X-Dazedly-Ray for Genesis (published by Unipac), released on August 26, 1990 (only in Japan).
Nolan Ryan's Baseball for Super NES (published by Romstar), released on July 2, 1991, in Japan and in February 1992 in North America.
Koushien 2 for Super NES (published by K Amusement Leasing), released on June 26, 1992
Cacoma Knight in Bizyland for Super NES (published by Datam Polystar), released on November 21, 1992, in Japan and in June 1993 in North America.
Kendo Rage for Super NES (published by Seta Corporation), released on January 22, 1993, in Japan and in October 1993 in North America.	
Super Real Mahjong PIV for Super NES (published by Seta Corporation), released on March 25, 1994 (only in Japan).
Zenkoku Koukou Soccer for Super NES (published by Yojigen), released on November 25, 1994 (only in Japan).
Aoki Densetsu Shoot! for Super NES (published by KSS), released on December 16, 1994.
Nada Asatarou no Powerful Mahjong: Tsugi no Itte 100 Dai for Game Boy, released on December 23, 1994 (only in Japan).
Game no Tatsujin for Sega Saturn (published by SunSoft), released on August 11, 1995 (only in Japan).
Quantum Gate I: Akumu no Joshou for PlayStation, released on June 6, 1997 (only in Japan).
0 Kara no Mahjong: Mahjong Youchien – Tamago Gumi for PlayStation, released on March 12, 1998 (only in Japan).
Mainichi Neko Youbi for PlayStation, released on September 3, 1998 (only in Japan).
0 Kara no Shogi: Shogi Youchien – Ayumi Kumi (Set 0) for PlayStation, released on April 8, 1999 (only in Japan).
Finger Flashing for PlayStation, released on July 15, 1999 (only in Japan).
Hikari no Shima: Seven Lithographs in Shining Island for PlayStation, released on November 11, 1999 (only in Japan).
Art Camion Sugorokuden for PlayStation, released on April 27, 2000 (only in Japan).
Phix no Daiboken: Phix in the Magnetix World for PlayStation, released on May 18, 2000, in Japan. Released as Phix: The Adventure in North America on July 15, 2003 and published by Agetec Inc.
Rung Rung: Oz no Mahou Tsukai – Another World for PlayStation, released on June 15, 2000, in Japan North America.
Tetris with Card Captor Sakura: Eternal Heart for PlayStation, released on August 10, 2000 (only in Japan).
0 Kara no Shogi: Shogi Youchien Ayumi Kumi R for PlayStation, released on August 10, 2000 (only in Japan).
Mahjong Youchien: Tamago Gumi 2 for PlayStation, released on September 28, 2000 (only in Japan).
Youchien Gaiden Kareinaru Casino Club: Double Draw for PlayStation, released on December 21, 2000 (only in Japan).
Mahjong Uranai Fortuna: Tsuki no Megami-tachi for PlayStation, released on February 1, 2001 (only in Japan).
Zera-Chan Puzzle: Pitatto Pair for PlayStation, released on March 15, 2001 (only in Japan).
Nihon Pro Mahjong Kishikai Kanshuu: Pro ni naru Mahjong DS for Nintendo DS, released on November 24, 2005 (only in Japan).
Tsubasa Chronicle Vol. 2 for Nintendo DS, released on April 20, 2006 (only in Japan).
Simple DS Series Vol. 11: Mou Ichido Kayoeru – The Otona no Shougakkou for Nintendo DS, released on December 7, 2006 (only in Japan).
Simple DS Series Vol. 25: The Koushounin for Nintendo DS, released on October 25, 2007 (only in Japan).
Custom Mahjong (SuperLite 2500) for Nintendo DS, released on December 20, 2007 (only in Japan).
Hoshizora no Comic Garden for Nintendo DS, released on September 11, 2008 (only in Japan).
Simple DS Series Vol. 44: The Gal Mahjong for Nintendo DS, released on September 25, 2008 (only in Japan).

References

External links
Official Website
RocketStats Plugin
GameFAQs page on Affect

Video game development companies
Video game companies of Japan